The 1982–83 Michigan Wolverines men's basketball team represented the University of Michigan in intercollegiate college basketball during the 1982–83 season. The team played its home games in the Crisler Arena in Ann Arbor, Michigan, and was a member of the Big Ten Conference.  Under the direction of head coach Bill Frieder, the team finished ninth in the Big Ten Conference.   The team failed to earn an invitation to either the 1983 National Invitation Tournament or the 1983 NCAA Men's Division I Basketball Tournament. The team was unranked for all eighteen weeks of Associated Press Top Twenty-Five Poll, and it also ended the season unranked in the final USA Today/CNN Poll.

Team players drafted into the NBA
Eight players from this team were selected in the NBA Draft.

References

Michigan
Michigan Wolverines men's basketball seasons
Michigan Wolverines men's basketball
Michigan Wolverines men's basketball